Sullivan's Island Historic District is a national historic district located at Sullivan's Island, Charleston County, South Carolina. The district encompasses 36 contributing buildings on Sullivan's Island.  They predominantly include the core residential and administrative areas of Fort Moultrie built between about 1870 to 1950. Also included are representative "Island Houses" and the Post Chapel. Notable buildings include  the Base Commander's Quarters, nine Senior Officers' Quarters, ten Junior Officers' Quarters, the Bachelor Officers' Quarters, the Administration Building, the Post Exchange and Gymnasium, and the Electrical Shop.

It was listed on the National Register of Historic Places in 2007.

References

Historic districts on the National Register of Historic Places in South Carolina
Buildings and structures in Charleston County, South Carolina
National Register of Historic Places in Charleston County, South Carolina